Phillips Payson (January 18, 1736 – January 11, 1801) was an American Congregationalist minister who was the pastor for the town of Chelsea, Massachusetts from 1757 until his death.

Payson is not the same man as Captain Samuel Payson who also fought during the Battle of Lexington. (Capt. Payson thereafter sold his farm to loan the money to his town to fund the revolution.)

He was born in Walpole, the son of Rev. Phillips Payson Sr. (1704–1778) and Anne Swift (1706–1756). The Payson family originated from Nazeing, England, first settling in the Massachusetts Bay Colony as early as 1635. Payson graduated from Harvard in 1754. He was ordained three years later. He married Elizabeth Stone (1735–1800), daughter of Rev. James Stone and Elizabeth Swift. Payson was a charter member of the American Academy of Arts and Sciences (1780).

History
Due to the policies of the British Empire, the free people of the Province of Massachusetts Bay were being reduced under a despotism that denied the authority of their elected representatives to govern. Instead a military government based in Boston had been granted absolute power.

Payson was the minister of a Protestant congregation in Chelsea, when he spoke an Election Sermon in support of the American Revolution and its goals of religious and civil liberty. He advocated a break from political tradition by emphasizing the new start of society in New England with statements (based on Galatians 4:26, 31) such as, "Recollecting our pious ancestors, the first settlers of the country, – nor shall we look for ancestry beyond that period, – and we may say in the most literal sense, we are children not of the bond woman, but of the free."

Rev. Dr. Payson and his congregants thereafter freely elected to support and protect their liberties, and formed an armed party to protect their parish. During the Battles of Lexington and Concord, their militia engaged British troops at Menotomy:
     "The Rev. Mr. Payson, of Chelsea, in Massachusetts Bay, a mild, thoughtful, sensible man, at the head of a party of his own parish, attacked a party of the regulars, killed some and took the rest prisoners. This gentleman has been hitherto on the side of government, but oppression having got to that pitch beyond which even a wise man cannot bear, he has taken up arms in defence of those rights, civil and religious, which cost their forefathers so dearly. The cruelty of the King’s troops, in some instances, I wish to disbelieve. They entered one house in Lexington where were two old men, one a deacon of the church, who was bed-ridden, and another not able to walk, who was sitting in his chair; both these they stabbed and killed on the spot, as well as an innocent child running out of the house.”– Pennsylvania Journal, August 2.

Bibliography

See also
 Edward Payson (1783–1827), nephew

References

1736 births
1801 deaths
Clergy in the American Revolution
Fellows of the American Academy of Arts and Sciences
Harvard College alumni
People of Massachusetts in the American Revolution
People from Walpole, Massachusetts
People from Chelsea, Massachusetts